The 1884–85 Scottish Districts season is a record of all the  rugby union matches for Scotland's district teams.

It includes the East of Scotland District versus West of Scotland District trial match.

History

Glasgow District won back the Inter-City from Edinburgh District.

Results

Inter-City

Glasgow District: F. Macindoe (Glasgow Academicals), R. G. Eaglesham (West of Scotland), M. F. Reid (West of Scotland), A. E. Stephen (West of Scotland), H. Kennedy (Glasgow Academionls), J. M. Ross (West of Scotland), J. B. Brown (Glasgow Academicals), G. H. Robb (Glasgow Academicals), J. French (Glasgow Academicals), A. Young (Glasgow Academicals), J. Jamieson (West of Scotland) [captain], D. Morton (West of Scotland), J. G. Mitchell (West of Scotland), A. Findlay (West of Scotland), and W. A. McDonald (1st Lanarkshire Rifle Volunteers).

Edinburgh District: Cameron (Watsonians), A. Ronald (Edinburgh Wanderers), Evans (Edinburgh University), G. Maitland (Edinburgh Institution), A. R. Don Wauchope (Edinburgh Wanderers), P. Cosens (Royal HSFP), William Peterkin (Edinburgh University). Reid (Edinburgh Academicals), T. Ainslie (Edinburgh Institution). Robert Maitland (Edinourgh Institution). J. Tod (Watsoniana), J. Brown (St. George), G. Henderson (Edinburgh Institution), J. Greig (Edinburgh Wanderers), Irvine (Edinburgh Academicals)

Other Scottish matches

East: J. P. Veitch (Royal HSFP), G. Maitland (Edinburgh Institution) L. Evans (Edinburgh University), McKenzie (Institution), A. R Don Wauchope (Fettesian-Lorrettonians) P. H. Cosens (Royal HSFP), C. Reid (Edinburgh Academicals), T. Ainslie (Edinburgh Institution), Dr. Tod (Watsonians), William Peterkin (Edinburgh University), Robert Maitland (Edinburgh Institution), R. Ainslie (Edinburgh Institution), W. Irvine (Edinburgh Academicals), Horsburgh (Royal HSFP), McEwen (Edinburgh Academicals) 
Reserves: W. Cameron (Watsonians), Aitken (Edinburgh Wanderers), Rutherford (Royal HSFP), W. J. Laing (Watsonians), Cosens (Royal HSFP), P. H. Don Wauchope (Edinburgh Wanderers), Greig (Edinburgh Wanderers), Douglas (Collegiate), Henderson (Edinburgh Institution)

West: Macindoe (Glasgow Academicals), Holms (Blair Lodge), Stephen (West of Scotland), Eaglesham (West of Scotland), Kennedy (Glasgow Academicals), Graham (Glasgow Academicals), Jamieson (West of Scotland), Morton (West of Scotland), Mitchell (West of Scotland), Robb (Glasgow Academicals), Young (Glasgow Academicals), French (Glasgow Academicals), Macdonald (Glasgow University)
Reserves: Finlay, W. Macdonald, Ker, Macdonald (lst Lanarkshire Volunteers), Holm, Bruce, Orr, W. McKendrick

English matches

No other District matches played.

International matches

No touring matches this season.

References

1884–85 in Scottish rugby union
Scottish Districts seasons